Alexandr Alexandrovich Fischer von Waldheim (born 20 April 1839 in Moscow, Russian Empire – died 24 February 1920 in Sochi, Russia) was a Russian botanist. He was a director of the Saint Petersburg Botanical Garden. He was the son of Alexandr Grigorievich Fischer von Waldheim (1803–1884) and the grandson of Gotthelf Fischer von Waldheim. In 1853, he was elected as a member to the American Philosophical Society.

References

1839 births
1920 deaths
19th-century botanists from the Russian Empire